Maigret and His Greatest Case (German: Maigret und sein grösster Fall) is a 1966 crime film directed by Alfred Weidenmann and starring Heinz Rühmann, Françoise Prévost and Günther Stoll. It was made as a co-production between Austria, France, Italy and West Germany. It is based on the 1931 novel Maigret at the Gai-Moulin featuring the fictional Sûreté detective Jules Maigret.

It was shot at the Sievering Studios in Vienna and on location in Lausanne. The film's sets were designed by the art director Hertha Hareiter.

Cast
 Heinz Rühmann as Kommissar Maigret
 Françoise Prévost as Simone Lefèbvre 
 Günther Stoll as Alain Robin 
 Günter Strack as Kommissar Delvigne
 Gerd Vespermann as Inspektor Caselle
 Christo Neggas as Adriano Genaro
 Ulli Lommel as René Delfosse
 Edwin Noel as Jean Chabeau
 Giacomo Furia as Marcello Genaro
 Claudio Camaso as Giorgio Genaro
 Alexander Kerst as André Delfosse
 Francesca Rosano as Franchita
 Peter Groß as Inspektor Lapointe 
 Silvana Sansoni as Animierdame
 Peter Gerhard as Museumsdirektor
 Rudolf Barry as Inspektor Lucas
 Walter Varndal as Bauchladenmann
 Günther Ungeheuer as Mr. Holoway
 Eddi Arent as François Labas

References

Bibliography
 Woeller, Waltraud & Cassiday, Bruce. The Literature of Crime and Detection: An Illustrated History from Antiquity to the Present. Ungar, 1988.

External links

1966 films
West German films
1966 crime films
1960s German-language films
Films based on Belgian novels
Maigret films
Films directed by Alfred Weidenmann
French crime films
Italian crime films
Austrian crime films
German crime films
Films shot at Sievering Studios
Constantin Film films
1960s Italian films
1960s French films
1960s German films